The 2017–18 Missouri State Lady Bears basketball team represented Missouri State University during the 2017–18 NCAA Division I women's basketball season. The Lady Bears, led by fifth year head coach Kellie Harper, played their home games at JQH Arena and were members of the Missouri Valley Conference. They finished the season 21–12, 15–3 in MVC play to finish in second place. They advanced to the semifinals of the Missouri Valley Tournament where they lost to Northern Iowa. They received an automatic bid to the Women's National Invitation Tournament where defeated Louisiana Tech in the first round before losing to TCU in the second round.

Previous season
They finished the season 16–15, 12–4 in MVC play to finish in third place. They lost in the semifinals of the Missouri Valley Tournament to Evansville. They received an automatic bid to the Women's National Invitation Tournament where they lost to Iowa in the first round.

Roster

Schedule

|-
! colspan="9" style=| Exhibition

|-
! colspan="9" style=| Non-conference regular season

|-
! colspan="9" style=| Missouri Valley regular season

|-
! colspan="9" style=| Missouri Valley Women's Tournament

|-
! colspan="9" style=| WNIT

See also
 2017–18 Missouri State Bears basketball team

References

Missouri State Lady Bears basketball seasons
Missouri State
Missouri State, basketball women
Missouri State, basketball women
Missouri State